The FIS Ski Flying World Ski Championships 1988 took place in Oberstdorf, West Germany for the record-tying third time, matching Planica, Yugoslavia (now Slovenia). Oberstdorf hosted the championships previously in 1973 and 1981.

Individual

Medal table

References
 FIS Ski flying World Championships 1988 results. - accessed 28 November 2009.

FIS Ski Flying World Championships
1988 in ski jumping
1988 in West German sport
1980s in Bavaria
Ski jumping competitions in West Germany
International sports competitions hosted by Germany
Sports competitions in Bavaria